Paruro is a town in Southern Peru, capital of the province Paruro in the region Cusco.

References

External links
Satellite map at Maplandia

Populated places in the Cusco Region